The Airbus RACER (Rapid and Cost-Effective Rotorcraft) is an experimental high-speed compound helicopter developed by Airbus Helicopters from the Eurocopter X³.

Revealed at the June 2017 Paris air show, final assembly will start in mid-2020 for a 2021 first flight.

Development

On 20 June 2017 at the Paris air show, Airbus Helicopters revealed a high-speed demonstrator configuration based on the X3
developed within the Clean Sky 2 research programme.
Its aerodynamic configuration was validated in 2017.
In February 2018, the  Safran Aneto-1X was preferred over the RTM322 initially selected, it is 25% more compact for the same power.

By October 2018, design of key subsystems was completed before the first components started manufacturing with long-lead items, as the lateral drive shaft production began.
GE's Avio Aero in Italy launched procurement and manufacturing of the lateral gear boxes housings, GE Aviation Systems in UK is building the wing’s titanium cradle, INCAS/Romaero in Romania started manufacturing the composite side panel and Aernnova in Spain the tail parts primary structure.

The flight demonstration should expand the flight envelope and assess performance, before demonstrating missions like EMS, SAR and private transport, while developing low-noise flight procedures.
Final assembly was due to start in mid-2020 for a first flight in the fourth quarter of 2021 however, primarily due to COVID-19 pandemic-related delays, only 50% of the components were completed by the spring of 2021. The final component, the gearbox, was expected to be delivered in Q1 2022 for ground testing and installation, with first flight anticipated at the beginning of Q2 in 2022.

Design
The lateral pusher propellers generate thrust and are isolated from passengers during ground operations by the box wings which serve to generate lift at cruise velocity. This allows the main rotor to be slowed by up to 15% as the craft's air speed increases and prevents the rotor blades breaking the sound barrier which would reduce performance.
Driven by two engines, of which one is capable of shutting down and restarting once inflight to save fuel and increase range, it will have a low weight and low maintenance hybrid metallic-composite airframe and lower weight high voltage direct current electrical generation.

See also

References

Airbus Helicopters aircraft
Compound helicopters
Experimental helicopters
Twin-turbine helicopters
Slowed rotor